Tammy Whittington (born October 12, 1965) is a former professional tennis player from the United States.

Biography
Whittington played college tennis in 1980s for the University of Florida, where she came to from Plantation High School in Broward County. She was a singles All-American for the Gators in both 1985 and 1987. After graduating in 1987 she turned professional.

On the professional circuit, Whittington reached a best ranking of 105 for singles. Her best performance on the WTA Tour was a quarter-final appearance at the 1991 Virginia Slims of Nashville, beating world number 50 Florencia Labat en route. She made the second round of the 1992 Wimbledon Championships. As a doubles player she won nine ITF titles and featured in the main draw of all four grand slam tournaments.

References

External links
 
 

1965 births
Living people
American female tennis players
Florida Gators women's tennis players
Tennis people from Florida
People from Plantation, Florida
Sportspeople from Broward County, Florida